"In a Shanty in Old Shanty Town" is a popular song written by Ira Schuster and Jack Little with lyrics by Joe Young, published in 1932.  Ted Lewis and His Band performed it in the film The Crooner in 1932. His version was released as a single and it went to #1, where it remained for 10 weeks.

Composition
The Johnny Long and His Orchestra had a million seller of the song in 1946. This version was a slight revision of the Long band's 1940 version. Their version reached #13. Jerry Lee Lewis recorded a version in the winter of 1958/1959. Somethin' Smith and the Redheads re-charted the song in 1956 where it reached #27.

In the contemporary 'stock' dance-band orchestration published by B. Feldman & Co., sole agents for M. Witmark & Sons (arranged by Frank Skinner) credit is given thus: words by Joe Young and music by Little Jack Little and John Siras. Ira Schuster is not given credit. Ira Schuster is also not mentioned in the credits for the song in the 1940 film "Always A Bride" or in the 1951 film Lullaby of Broadway starring Doris Day.

References

1932 songs
1932 singles
Songs with music by Jack Little (songwriter)
Songs with music by Ira Schuster
Songs with lyrics by Joe Young (lyricist)
Jerry Lee Lewis songs